Conlen may refer to:

Bernie Conlen (born 1960), Australian rules footballer
Conlen, Texas, an unincorporated community in Dallam County, Texas